Marlene Behrmann (born April 14, 1959) is a Professor in the Department of Ophthalmology at the [(University of Pittsburgh)]. She was previously a Professor of Psychology at Carnegie Mellon University. She specializes in the cognitive neuroscience of visual perception, with a specific focus on object recognition.

Education
Marlene Behrmann was born in Johannesburg, South Africa, April 14, 1959. She received a B.A. in speech and hearing therapy from the University of Witwatersrand in Johannesburg, South Africa in 1981; an M.A. in speech pathology from the University of Witwatersrand in 1984, and a Ph.D. in Psychology from the University of Toronto in 1991.

Career and research
From 1991 to 1993, Behrmann worked in the Departments of Psychology and Medicine of the University of Toronto, and in 1993, she accepted a position as a faculty member in the Department of Psychology at Carnegie Mellon University, where she has remained since. She has also held an adjunct professorship in the Departments of Neuroscience and Communication Disorders at the University of Pittsburgh since 1994, and she has served as a Visiting Professor at the Weizmann Institute of Science in Israel in 2000-2001 and the University of Toronto in 2006–2007. Behrmann is a member of the Center for the Neural Basis of Cognition and the Neuroscience Institute.

Behrmann's research addresses a specific question: How does the brain assemble a meaningful and coherent interpretation of the sparse information received from the eyes? Widely considered to be a trailblazer and a worldwide leader in the field of visual cognition, Behrmann uses neuroimaging and psychophysics to study the human visual system in health and disease to answer this question.

Awards and honors
 2015, elected member of the National Academy of Sciences 
 2019, member, American Academy of Arts and Sciences 
 Fellow, Society of Experimental Psychologists, 
 Fellow, Cognitive Science Society 
 Fellow, Cognitive Neuroscience Society

Representative papers
 Granovetter, M.C., Ettensohn, L., Robert, S and Behrmann, M. (2022). With Childhood Hemispherectomy, One Hemisphere Can Support--But is Suboptimal for--Word and Face Recognition, PNAS, 119(44):e2212936119. doi: 10.1073/pnas.2212936119. https://biorxiv.org/cgi/content/short/2020.11.06.371823v1

 Liu, N., Behrmann, M., Turchi, J. N., Avidan, G., Hadj-Bouziane, F. and Ungerleider, L. (2022). Hierarchical organization of face patches in macaque cortex as revealed by fMRI and pharmacological inactivation, Nature Communication, 13(1):6787. doi: 10.1038/s41467-022-34451-x.

 Blauch, N. M., Behrmann, M. and Plaut, D. C. (2022). A connectivity-constrained computational account of topographic organization in high-level visual cortex, PNAS, 119(3):e2112566119. doi: 10.1073/pnas.2112566119.

 Avidan G, Behrmann M. Spatial Integration in Normal Face Processing and Its Breakdown in Congenital Prosopagnosia. Annu Rev Vis Sci. 2021 Sep 15;7:301-321. doi: 10.1146/annurev-vision-113020-012740.

References

External links

Marlene Behrmann's Biography - CMU Department of Psychology
Marlene Behrmann's Cognitive Neuroscience Lab

1959 births
Living people
American cognitive neuroscientists
American women neuroscientists
American women psychologists
University of the Witwatersrand alumni
University of Toronto alumni
Academic staff of the University of Toronto
Carnegie Mellon University faculty
Fellows of the Society of Experimental Psychologists
Fellows of the Cognitive Science Society
Members of the United States National Academy of Sciences
Place of birth missing (living people)
People from Johannesburg
Jewish women scientists 
Jewish American scientists 
Neuroimaging researchers
20th-century American women scientists
21st-century American women scientists
South African emigrants to the United States